Neset or Nesset is a village area in the municipality of Levanger in Trøndelag county, Norway.  It is located on a peninsula in the Trondheimsfjord just west of the town of Levanger, and north of Alstadhaug.  Its population in 1999 was 245, but since 2001 it has been considered a part of the town of Levanger so separate population statistics are no longer tracked.

Bamberg Church is located in Nesset.

References

Villages in Trøndelag
Levanger